Jashabir Tripura (born 1 Feb 1959) is an Indian politician and member of Tripura Legislative Assembly from the Jolaibari constituency since 2003. He is a member of the Communist Party of India (Marxist) and Central Committee member of Ganamukti Parishad.

Political career
Jashabir was a Tripura Govt. Teacher employer and member of the T.G.T.A & T.U.K.C from 1998 to 2002. In the 2003 Tripura Assembly election, he was elected for the first time on a CPI(M) ticket from the Jolaibari constituency. He was also re-elected as an M.L.A in 2008, 2013 and 2018.

See also
 Jitendra Choudhury
 Radhacharan Debbarma
 Pravat Chowdhury

References

1959 births
Tripuri people
Living people
Communist Party of India (Marxist) politicians
Tripura politicians
Communist Party of India (Marxist) politicians from Tripura